Eclipse is an album by the British pop group Five Star. Released in 2001, the album was released via the Internet only through the group's fan club, run by their father and then-manager, Buster Pearson. The CD was a professionally printed disc, with CD booklet including sleeve notes and track information. The art work was designed by Pearson.

The album was never properly "completed" and only released at the insistence of their manager/father. The band's future was in question at this time as Doris and Delroy no longer wanted to perform, though both contributed to the Eclipse sessions. The band promoted the album as a threesome of Stedman, Lorraine and Deniece Pearson.

Only one single was issued from the album, "Funktafied". Again, this could only be purchased from their fan club.
 
Eclipse is Five Star's last studio album to date. Some of the tracks are songs that appeared on their 1994 album, Heart and Soul, but are included in a slightly remixed form or as an alternative version.

Track listing
 "I Wish Me You"
 "Hung Up"
 "Eyes Don't Lie"
 "I Get Such a High" 
 "The Writing on the Wall" (remixed version)  From Heart & Soul 1995 
 "Got a Lot of Love" (remix) From Heart & Soul 1995 
 "Don't Let Me Be the Lonely One"
 "Surely" (remix)From Heart & Soul 1995  
 "I Love You (For Sentimental Reasons)" (no rap) From Heart & Soul 1995 
 "Funktafied" * issued as a single 
 "One Way Mirror" [ Lead vocals Doris Pearson ]
 "Tell Me What You Want"
 "Get a Life Together" [ Lead vocals Doris Pearson ]
 "I Give You Give" (remix) From Heart & Soul 1995

Five Star albums
2001 albums